A list of films produced in Italy in 1975 (see 1975 in film):

Footnotes

References

External links
Italian films of 1975 at the Internet Movie Database

1975
Films
Lists of 1975 films by country or language